The Cook County Republican Party is a political party which represents voters in 50 wards in the city of Chicago and 30 suburban townships of Cook County. Cook County is the second-most populous county in the United States.

Organization and leadership
Current chairman, Sean M. Morrison, was elected to the position by the committeemen in April 2016.

Committeepeople

As of May 2021:

History

Chairs

See also 
 Cook County Democratic Party
 Political history of Chicago

References

Republican Party (United States) organizations
Political parties in Illinois
Cook County, Illinois